Längtan may refer to:

 Längtan (Scotts album) (2009)
 Längtan (Timoteij album) (2010)
 Langtan, Qing commander at the Siege of Albazin (1685 and 1686)

See also
 Langtang (disambiguation)